Rig Castle is a Castle related to the Seljuq dynasty and is located in the Kashmar County, Quzhd village.

References 

Castles in Iran
Seljuk castles
Buildings and structures in Razavi Khorasan Province
Ruined castles in Iran
Buildings and structures in Kashmar
National works of Iran
Tourist attractions in Razavi Khorasan Province